The Hazrat Nizamuddin - Habibganj Express is a mail/express train of Indian Railways, which runs between Hazrat Nizamuddin railway station of Delhi, the capital city of India and Habibganj railway station of Bhopal, the capital city of Central Indian state, Madhya Pradesh. The train is India's first ISO certified train. The train is known for its facilities, such as a coffee vending machine, mini pantry, library, and GPS. The train is also known for its maintenance and punctuality.

Route and halts
The train goes via Agra & Bina Junction. The important halts of the train are:
 NIZAMUDDIN
 Agra Cantt.
 Morena
 Gwalior Junction
 Jhansi Junction
 Bina Junction
 Ganj Basoda
 Vidisha
 Bhopal Junction
 HABIBGANJ

See also
Avantika Express
Indore Junction
Bhopal Junction

References

Express trains in India
Transport in Bhopal
Transport in Delhi
Railway services introduced in 1995
Rail transport in Madhya Pradesh